is a railway station on the Kagoshima Main Line and the Sanyō Main Line, operated by Kyushu Railway Company in Moji-ku, Kitakyushu, Japan.

Passenger statistics
In fiscal 2016, the station was used by an average of 6,392 passengers daily (boarding passengers only), and it ranked 29th among the busiest stations of JR Kyushu.

Station number code
for the Kagoshima Main Line: 
for the Sanyō Main Line:

References

Railway stations in Fukuoka Prefecture
Railway stations in Japan opened in 1891